Autographiviridae is a family of viruses in the order Caudovirales. Bacteria serve as natural hosts. There are 373 species in this family, assigned to 9 subfamilies and 133 genera.

History
Since the 1990s, the term "T7 supergroup" has been coined for the expanding group of bacteriophages related to coliphage T7, as members of the family Podoviridae. Enterobacteriaceae phages SP6 and K1-5 were the first to be considered as an estranged subgroup of the "T7 supergroup". Pseudomonas phage phiKMV also shared commonalities at the genome organizational level. As such, based on the available morphological and proteomic data, this clade of viruses was established as a subfamily of the family Podoviridae. The subfamily was later raised to the level of family in 2019.

Etymology
The name of this family, termed Autographiviridae, refers to the “auto-graphein” or “self-transcribing” phages which encode their own (single subunit) RNA polymerase, a common characteristic among its members.

Structure
Viruses in Autographiviridae are non-enveloped, with icosahedral and  Head-tail geometries, and T=7 symmetry. The diameter is around 60 nm. Genomes are linear, around 40-42kb in length.

Life cycle
Viral replication is cytoplasmic. DNA templated transcription is the method of transcription. The virus exits the host cell by lysis, and holin/endolysin/spanin proteins. Bacteria serve as the natural host. Transmission routes are passive diffusion.

Taxonomy
The following subfamilies are recognized:
 Beijerinckvirinae
 Colwellvirinae
 Corkvirinae
 Krylovirinae
 Melnykvirinae
 Molineuxvirinae
 Okabevirinae
 Slopekvirinae
 Studiervirinae

The following genera are unassigned to a subfamily:

 Aegirvirus
 Anchaingvirus
 Aqualcavirus
 Ashivirus
 Atuphduovirus
 Ayakvirus
 Ayaqvirus
 Banchanvirus
 Bifseptvirus
 Bonnellvirus
 Cheungvirus
 Chosvirus
 Cuernavacavirus
 Cyclitvirus
 Ermolevavirus
 Foturvirus
 Foussvirus
 Fussvirus
 Gajwadongvirus
 Gyeongsanvirus
 Igirivirus
 Jalkavirus
 Jiaoyazivirus
 Kafavirus
 Kajamvirus
 Kakivirus
 Kalppathivirus
 Kelmasvirus
 Kembevirus
 Krakvirus
 Lauvirus
 Limelightvirus
 Lingvirus
 Lirvirus
 Lullwatervirus
 Maculvirus
 Napahaivirus
 Nohivirus
 Oinezvirus
 Paadamvirus
 Pagavirus
 Pairvirus
 Pedosvirus
 Pekhitvirus
 Pelagivirus
 Percyvirus
 Piedvirus
 Podivirus
 Pollyceevirus
 Poseidonvirus
 Powvirus
 Pradovirus
 Qadamvirus
 Scottvirus
 Sednavirus
 Serkorvirus
 Sieqvirus
 Stompelvirus
 Stopalavirus
 Stopavirus
 Stupnyavirus
 Tangaroavirus
 Tawavirus
 Tiamatvirus
 Tiilvirus
 Tritonvirus
 Voetvirus
 Votkovvirus
 Waewaevirus
 Wuhanvirus (not to be confused with severe acute respiratory syndrome coronavirus 2)

References

External links

 Viralzone: Autographivirinae
 ICTV

 
Virus families